CBSM as an abbreviation or initialism may stand for:

CBSM-FM, a radio station
Central Bank of San Marino
Collective Behavior and Social Movements Section of the ASA, a sociological organization
 Community-based social marketing, which fosters ecologically sustainable behavior; see section on applications